Ghundi is a 2013 Pakistani television comedy drama series directed by Kashif Nisar, written by Faiza Iftikhar and produced by Humayun Saeed and Shehzad Nadeeb under banner Six Sigma Plus. It starred Uroosa Siddiqui, Uzma Hassan, Haseeb Muhammad Bin Qasim, Sohail Sameer, Agha Ali and Rahma Ali in leading roles.

Plot 
The plot focuses on a typical Pehalwan family of Lahore which comprises three brothers who care and love her young sister so much that she becomes rotten and spoilt. The family consider her as a good luck signature and tries to fulfill her every single desire and wants to marry her.

Cast 
 Uroosa Siddiqui as Neelofar Chaudhry aka Neelo; spoilt and the only daughter of Pehalwan family
 Haseeb Muhammad Bin Qasim as Yaqoob; Neelo's elder brother
 Sohail Sameer as Saqib; Neloo's second brother who wants to marry
 Kamran Mujahid; Neelo's younger brother and a Pehalwan
 Uzma Hassan as Rukhsana; Yaqoob's wife, cunning in nature and loves Neelo as her daughter
 Agha Ali as Rehan; Yaqoob's adapted son and simple innocent guy who obeys Yaqoob as his elder brother
 Adnan Shah Tipu as Mateen
 Farhana Maqsood as Marjana; Saqib's friend and wants to marry him
 Farah Tufail as Nargis; Neelo's friend who keeps eyes on Rehan
 Rahma Ali
 Tahira Imam

References 

2013 Pakistani television series debuts
Hum Sitaray
Pakistani comedy television series